AM-11245 is a drug which is a cannabinoid agonist from the classical cannabinoid family. It has high affinity and efficacy at both the CB1 and CB2 cannabinoid receptors, with a Ki of 0.4nM at both CB1 and CB2, and an EC50 of ~0.06nM at CB1 and 0.2nM at CB2, making it one of the most potent cannabinoid agonists identified to date.

See also 
 HU-243
 O-774
 List of AM cannabinoids

References 

Benzochromenes
Phenols
AM cannabinoids
Nitriles